"Can I Change My Mind" is a 1968 single recorded by soul singer Tyrone Davis, his featured debut. The song hit number one on the Billboard Hot R&B Singles chart on February 1, 1969, replacing Marvin Gaye's "I Heard It through the Grapevine". It peaked at number five on the Hot 100, and reached RIAA Certified Gold status on February 24, 1969.

The song is featured in the Larry Clark film Another Day in Paradise (1998).

Other versions
The song has been covered by Roy Buchanan, Billy Price, Boz Scaggs (on his 2013 album Memphis), Michael McDonald (on his 2008 album Soul Speak), Delbert McClinton (on his 1992 album Never Been Rocked Enough), the Pietasters and others.

In 1999, the backing track of the song was sampled by the Italian singer Piotta, for his song called Supercafone.

Chart history

References

1968 debut singles
1968 songs